Mwera is a village in Zanzibar east of Zanzibar City on the road to the western coast of the island. This was the birthplace of Abeid Karume, the first President after the 1964 revolution.

Villages in Zanzibar